PopMaster (briefly known as Celebrity PopMaster from 2007–2008) is a popular music radio quiz. Between February 1998 and March 2023, the quiz was part of the weekday morning Ken Bruce Show on BBC Radio 2. The questions were originally devised by radio producer and music collector Phil "The Collector" Swern, but are now written by Neil Myners and Simon Bray. On 17 January 2023, Bruce announced that he would be leaving Radio 2 in March, and would be joining Greatest Hits Radio, which announced that PopMaster would continue on his new show, starting on 3 April. The final edition of PopMaster on Radio 2 was broadcast on 3 March, Bruce's last show for the station.

Structure
Two contestants play against each other for the chance to win, until May 2022, a DAB digital radio. Since June 2022 the prizes were changed to either Bluetooth headphones or a smart speaker. Each contestant is asked ten questions based on popular music from the 1950s through to the present day. Correct answers to the questions are worth three points, other than for the third, sixth and ninth "bonus" questions on a topic chosen by the contestant, from two options offered by the host prior to the start of the quiz. The bonus questions involve listening to a brief piece of music and, if answered correctly, are worth six points. There is, therefore, a maximum total of 39 points on offer. If a contestant has scored no points prior to their final three-point question, Bruce will sometimes "help" them with the question if required. However, during one December 2021 edition when Scott Mills was sitting in for Bruce, a contestant failed to answer a single question correctly and scored no points. Also, in a June 2021 edition, the first contestant answered only one question correctly leaving Bruce unable to help the second contestant score as they also failed to answer any questions correctly.

The winning contestant then goes on to play "Three-in-Ten". In this part of the quiz they have ten seconds to name three UK Singles Chart hits for a particular artist or group named by Bruce. If they successfully manage this they win a smart speaker; if they fail, they win some Bluetooth headphones. However, if a contestant scores 39 points in the main quiz, they automatically win a smart speaker, and the losing contestant plays the Three-in-Ten instead. Should both contestants score the same number of points (and the score is less than the maximum), a tie-break is used to decide who will play Three-in-Ten.

A "One Year Out" T-shirt is given to the losing contestant, so named because when answering "Name the Year" type questions, contestants are very often just one year out, causing Bruce to exclaim "One year out!". "One Year Out" T-shirts are often heard to be accepted by contestants as a desirable consolation.

At the end of the year, the best contestants (those who score 39 points, or 36 points and also win the "Three-in-Ten") return for a "Champions League PopMaster", the structure of which is different. The contestants start with their original score from their first appearance, and then proceed to answer ten questions which are worth their ordinal values i.e., question one is worth one point, question two is worth two points and so on. The contestants still choose a bonus subject, but this is only worth its value in the order of the questions. The score is then added to their original score, and the two highest-scoring contestants return for a final to determine the year's champion. Due to Ken's departure from Radio 2 taking the Popmaster quiz with him, it's unknown what will happen to those contestants who scored 39 points on the BBC during 2023. 

When Bruce is on holiday, PopMaster continues with stand-in presenters; these have included Alex Lester, Stuart Maconie, Michael Ball, Claudia Winkleman, Simon Mayo, Richard Allinson, Aled Jones, Zoe Ball, Fearne Cotton, Sara Cox, Trevor Nelson, Gary Davies, Jo Whiley, Scott Mills and DJ Spoony.

2007 suspension and celebrity version

Despite never having been implicated, PopMaster was suspended for one day on 19 July 2007 in line with the BBC's blanket ban on television and radio competitions following several phone-in scandals. The following day, PopMaster returned without prizes or public entry, with the contestants consisting of celebrities and BBC staff. Between 20 July 2007 and 18 January 2008, when the quiz was played with celebrity contestants, no prizes were awarded and Three-in-Ten was not held.

It was rumoured that members of the public would be able to play again before Christmas 2007, though this did not happen. On 30 December 2007 it was announced that the quiz would be one of the first BBC phone-in competitions to return in January 2008. The quiz returned on 21 January 2008. New background music and dramatic, orchestral and guitar-based jingles for the quiz were introduced on the same day. The contestant application procedure reverted to the original write-in method, but now prospective contestants are invited on the day. Due to concerns over the spread of Covid-19, since 2020 potential contestants apply via email.

On 28 May 2010, Bruce hosted a special Eurovision celebrity edition of the quiz, live from Oslo, Norway. Eurovision Song Contest commentator for BBC Three, Paddy O'Connell, took on the author of The Eurovision Song Contest - The Official History, John Kennedy O'Connor, to answer questions on the contest, with O'Connor winning. On 25 May 2012, a second Eurovision celebrity edition of the quiz was hosted live from Baku, Azerbaijan. The BBC's Moscow Correspondent, Steve Rosenberg, narrowly lost to O'Connor.

A third "Eurovision Popmaster" was held live on 17 May 2013 from Malmö, Sweden, on the eve of the 2013 contest, with Bruce competing against Paddy O'Connell and John Kennedy O'Connor chairing the quiz.

On Bank Holiday Monday, 25 May 2020, Bruce hosted an "All-Day" tournament of the quiz, with celebrities playing against members of the public. There were eight heats, two semi-finals and a grand final, between 7:30am and 5:30pm. For this version, contestants could pick up the normal 39 points, with an extra five being awarded for successfully completing the Three-in-Ten round. Wlodziu Kula-Przezwanski won the contest. This format returned again on 31 May 2021. Jenny Ryan from The Chase was crowned the winner.

On 28 May 2021, in the lead-up to the broadcast of a documentary about the quiz called One Year Out: The PopMaster Story, the first ever contestants from February 1998 returned to play a rematch.

Online
An interactive version of PopMaster was launched on 1 March 2010. The game can now be played on the Radio 2 web and mobile sites, or in a Facebook application. The game features text, image, sound and video questions, and scores are determined by how quickly the player answers correctly. A voiceover from Ken Bruce features throughout the game. Players can also challenge friends to beat their high scores. The maximum score possible is 39.

Since 29 October 2018, PopMaster has been available as a podcast for thirty days after the original broadcast. The podcast edits out some personal details of the contestants for privacy reasons. Instead, at the end of the podcast episode, Ken Bruce reads out a selection of listener emails from after the live broadcast.

Other
PopMaster was parodied by comedian and BBC 6 Music presenter Jon Holmes on his weekend show in the game "Ken Bruce Master". The game is described thus: "On PopMaster listeners have to answer questions about pop stars. On Ken Bruce Master pop stars have to answer questions about Ken Bruce." Very surreal questions then follow, in the style of Chuck Norris facts. Many pop and rock stars have played the game for "no prizes whatsoever due to current compliance guidelines." At Christmas 2007 Ken Bruce himself participated, and lost.

The format of PopMaster is similar to that of David Hamilton's Music Game which ran on his Radio 2 show in the late 1970s and early to mid-1980s.

BBC Radio 2 replaced PopMaster with a new daily quiz called Ten To The Top launched at the start of Gary Davies's interim period covering the morning show and continuing with Vernon Kay as its permanent host.

References

External links

Quiz games
BBC Radio 2 programmes